Texas Department of State Health Services is a state agency of Texas. The department was created by House Bill 2292 of the 78th Texas Legislature in 2003 through the merging of four state agencies: the Texas Department of Health, Texas Department of Mental Health and Mental Retardation, Texas Health Care Information Council, and Texas Commission on Alcohol and Drug Abuse. The department provides state-operated health care services, including hospitals, health centers, and health agencies. The agency is headquartered at the Central Campus at 1100 West 49th Street in Austin. The DSHS Council governs the department.

The agency's Mental Health and Substance Abuse Division, along with Public Policy Research Institute at Texas A&M University coordinate the Texas School Survey, a program consisting of two surveys on drug and alcohol abuse, an annual one done at the local school-district level and a biennial statewide survey. The statewide survey, called the Texas School Survey of Substance Use, is the largest survey of its kind to be conducted in the United States and administered to over 100,000 public school students between grades 7–12.

Leadership
Dr. John Hellerstedt is the Commissioner of the Texas Department of State Health Services.

Geographic structure
The agency provides an array of public health services and oversight across the state through eight regional offices.
 Region 1 - Lubbock
 Region 2/3 - Arlington
 Region 4/5 North - Tyler
 Region 6/5 South - Houston
 Region 7 - Temple
 Region 8 - San Antonio 
 Region 9/10 - El Paso
 Region 11 - Harlingen

References

External links

 
 TexasDSHS - YouTube
Commissioner's 2020 message to agency staff: https://vimeo.com/481396814/494288bd08

State Health Services
State departments of health of the United States
Healthcare in Texas
Medical and health organizations based in Texas
2003 establishments in Texas